Paulo Roberto Dias is a retired professional Brazilian football goalkeeper who played one season in the North American Soccer League.

Player
In 1972, Dias played for the Miami Gatos in the North American Soccer League.  In 1979, he played for the Cleveland Cobras in the American Soccer League.

Coach
In July 1991, he replaced Dave MacWilliams as head coach of the Penn-Jersey Spirit of the American Professional Soccer League.  On August 29, 1991, Harvard hired Dias as an assistant coach.

References

External links
NASL Stats

1944 births
Living people
American Professional Soccer League coaches
American Soccer League (1933–1983) players
Brazilian footballers
Brazilian expatriate footballers
Cleveland Cobras players
Miami Toros players
Harvard Crimson men's soccer coaches
North American Soccer League (1968–1984) players
Association football goalkeepers
Brazilian football managers
Footballers from Rio de Janeiro (city)